Jacob John Mkunda is a Tanzanian military officer who currently serves as Chief of the Tanzanian People's Defence Force since 30 June 2022.

Early life 
Mkunda attended the Ruvu Secondary School, where he played on the football team and was involved in student government.

Career 
In February 2020, Mkunda, at the rank of brigadier, led the Tanzanian People's Defence Force's (TPDF) 202nd Western Brigade in Kitavi in an operation to suppress rebel activity in refugee settlements, leading to weapons seizures and several arrests. By 2021 he was chief of the TPDF's training staff.

On 30 June 2022 Mkunda was appointed Chief of Defence Forces, replacing retiring General Venance Salvatory Mabeyo.

References

External links 
Army supports Suluhu's military diplomacy drive, Africa Intelligence, March 17, 2023 (requires free registration)

Tanzanian generals
National Defence College, India alumni